Arthur Louis Powell (February 25, 1937 – April 6, 2015) was an American football wide receiver.

Early career
Powell attended and played high school football at San Diego High School and played college football at San Jose State University. His brother, Charlie Powell was also a professional football player.

Professional career
Powell played for the Montreal Alouettes and Toronto Argonauts of the Canadian football league in 1957 and 1958. Powell played in the American Football League (AFL) for the New York Titans, Oakland Raiders, and the Buffalo Bills.  He also played in the National Football League (NFL) for the Philadelphia Eagles and Minnesota Vikings.

Possessing the size, speed and ability to make remarkable plays all over the field, Powell was one of the American Football League's first stars.  With the New York Titans, Powell led the AFL in receiving touchdowns in 1960 and in receiving yards in 1962.  He then led the league in both categories in 1963 after moving to the Raiders.

Powell began his American professional career after he was drafted by the Philadelphia Eagles and put together an impressive rookie season in 1959, finishing second in kickoff returns with a 27-yard average while serving as a reserve defensive back.  Included in those returns was a 95-yard touchdown run against the New York Giants on October 4 that jolted the defending conference champions in a 49-21 defeat. Powell refused to play in a 1960 preseason game against the Washington Redskins in Norfolk, Va., upon learning that the Eagles' black players would not be given rooms at the team's hotel. 

After being released, Powell joined the AFL's Titans in 1960, and was soon establishing his receiving credentials after a position change by Titans' head coach Sammy Baugh, scoring four touchdowns in his first contest.  During the league's first three seasons, Powell teamed with Don Maynard to form the first wide receiver tandem ever to gain over 1,000 receiving yards each in receptions.  In fact, the duo accomplished that feat in 1960, the first year of the AFL's existence.  They repeated the feat in 1962. 
When the Titans faced the Houston Oilers in a 1961 preseason game in Greenville, S.C., and housed their black players at a run-down hotel in a black neighborhood, Powell again staged a one-man boycott. 

Despite his status as the team's leading receiver, Powell was preparing to leave for another team following the conclusion of the 1962 season due to the Titans' continuing financial troubles.  In order to obtain something for him, while also alleviating the team's finances, Titan owner Harry Wismer offered him for sale on October to the highest bidder on October 19, 1962.

Oakland would be Powell's eventual destination, signing with the team on January 31, 1963.  During his first year with the Raiders in 1963, the team's record improved by nine games under the leadership of new head coach Al Davis, with Powell scoring 16 touchdowns and catching 73 passes for 1,394 yards.

Off the field, Powell was showing his team leadership when he, along with teammates Bo Roberson, Clem Daniels and Fred Williamson, refused to play in an exhibition game against his old team, the now rechristened New York Jets because of segregated seating in Mobile's Ladd Stadium.

Powell requested to be traded to Buffalo so he could pursue business opportunities in the Toronto area, and Raiders owner Al Davis agreed to do so.

He finished ranked third all time in yards gained in the AFL with 8,015, behind Don Maynard (10,289) and Lance Alworth (8,976).

Four decades after his playing career ended, Powell remains the Raiders fourth all-time leading receiver, scoring 50 touchdowns during his four seasons with Oakland.  With five seasons of over 1,000 receiving yards, he earned American Football League All-Star accolades for four straight years and was among a select group that was chosen on the All-Time All-AFL Team.  The latter balloting took place in 1970 following the merger between the AFL and NFL, and was selected by Hall of Fame selectors and wire services.  Despite catching only 479 career passes, Powell pulled in 81 for touchdowns and he still ranks 26th all-time in career touchdown receptions, and his career touchdown rate of 16.9% (that is, the percentage of his catches that went for touchdowns) is amongst the best in history.

In 2019, the Professional Football Researchers Association named Powell to the PFRA Hall of Very Good Class of 2019

Death

On April 6, 2015, Powell died at the age of 78, less than a year after the death of his older brother, Charlie.

See also
 List of American Football League players

References

1937 births
2015 deaths
American football wide receivers
Buffalo Bills players
Minnesota Vikings players
New York Titans (AFL) players
Oakland Raiders players
Philadelphia Eagles players
Players of American football from San Diego
San Jose State Spartans football players
American Football League All-Star players
American Football League All-Time Team
American Football League players
San Diego High School alumni